Rocco Jemma (1866–1949) was an Italian pediatrician.

Biography
Jemma became Director of Pediatric Clinic in Palermo in 1893. He held this position until 1914 when he left it to his pupil Giovanni Di Cristina and took the same role in Naples. His studies focused mainly on the infectious (confirmation of the etiology of the leishmaniasis parasite, vaccine therapy of typhoid, paratyphoid, melitense infection) and nutrition (infant nutrition disorders). In 1929 new Pediatric Clinic in Naples was inaugurated under his direction.

Bibliography
 Italo Farnetani, Rocco Jemma il più grande pediatra italiano, Cogral, Limbadi (VV) 2006, pp. 74.
 Italo Farnetani, Storia della pediatria italiana, Società Italiana di Pediatria, Genova, 2008, pp. 72–73, 76, 80–81. 
 Giuseppe Caronia, "Rocco Jemma (1866 - 1949) in <<LA PEDIATRIA>>. Estratto. Anno LVII. 1949.
Italo Farnetani, Francesca Farnetani, La top twelve della ricerca italiana, « Minerva Pediatrica» 2015; 67 (5): pp. 437–450 .
Italo Farnetani, Qualche notazione di storia della pediatria, in margine alla V edizione di Pediatria Essenziale, Postfazione. In Burgio G.R.( (a cura di). Pediatria Essenziale. 5a Ed.  Milano: Edi-Ermes; 2012.  . vol. 2°, pp. 1757–1764.

External links
 Biography
 Italo Farnetani, Jemma, Roccoo, Dizionario Biografico degli Italiani Istituto della Enciclopedia Italiana fondata da Giovanni Treccani. Roma: Istituto della Enciclopedia Italiana; 2004. Vol. 62, pp. 193 –196. http://www.treccani.it/enciclopedia/rocco-jemma_(Dizionario-Biografico)/

1866 births
1949 deaths
People from the Province of Reggio Calabria
Italian pediatricians